Members of the New South Wales Legislative Council between 1943 and 1946 were indirectly elected by a joint sitting of the New South Wales Parliament, with 15 members elected every three years. The most recent election was on 18 December 1942, with the term of new members commencing on 23 April 1943. The President was Sir John Peden.

See also
First McKell ministry
Second McKell ministry

References

Members of New South Wales parliaments by term
20th-century Australian politicians